Neoplecostominae is a subfamily of South American catfishes of the family Loricariidae. Species of this subfamily live in high-mountain and swift-flowing river habitats.

Taxonomy
This subfamily is the most basal clade in Loricariidae with the exception of Lithogeneinae. The genera do not form a monophyletic assemblage. Neoplecostominae is not diagnosed by any unique characteristic. However, molecular studies have supported this grouping.

Within the paraphyletic Neoplecostominae, Pareiorhina forms a monophyletic subunit that also includes Neoplecostomus.

References

Loricariidae
Fish of South America
Ray-finned fish subfamilies
Taxa named by Charles Tate Regan